This is a list of prison films—films which are primarily concerned with prison life or prison escape.

0-9 
 13 Dead Men
 20,000 Years in Sing Sing
 3 Deewarein
 6,000 Enemies

A 
 The Adventures of Huckleberry Finn (1939)
 Angel on My Shoulder
 Against the Wall
 Alien 3
 American History X
 Animal Factory
 Anything for Her
 Around the World in 80 Days (1956)

B 
 Bad Boys (1983)
 Bangkok Hilton
 Beyond Re-Animator
 The Big Bird Cage
 The Big Doll House
 The Big House (1930)
 Big Stan
 Birdman of Alcatraz
 Black Mama White Mama
 Blackmail
 Blood In Blood Out
 Bloodfist III: Forced to Fight
 Borstal Boy
 Boys' Reformatory
 Brawl in Cell Block 99
 Breath (2007)
 Bride of Frankenstein
 Bringing Up Baby
 Brokedown Palace
 Bronson
 Brubaker
 Brute Force (1947)

C 
 Caesar Must Die
 Caged Fury (1989)
 Caged in Paradiso
 Canon City
 Captain America: Civil War
 Captain Blood (1935)
 Captives Carandiru The Case Is Closed, Forget It Castle on the Hudson Cell 211 Cell 2455, Death Row (1955)
 The Chain Gang (1930)
 Chain Gang (1950)
 Chain Gang (1984)
 Chained Heat Chicago (2002 film) Chicken Run Chopper Civil Brand Clash by Night (1963)
 A Clockwork Orange Con Air Con Games The Concrete Jungle Condition Red Convict 13 Convicted (1950)
 Convicts 4 Cool Hand Luke The Count of Monte Cristo (1934)
 Crime After Crime The Criminal The Criminal Code Crulic: The Path to Beyond D 
 Dear Sarah Death Warrant Deathrow Gameshow Destroyer Devil's Island (1939)
 Dirty Hands (2008)
 Dog Pound Doing Hard Time Doing Time (2002)
 Don't Let Them Shoot the Kite Dracula's Daughter Dressed to Kill (1946)
 Dragon in Jail Dust Be My Destiny E 
 Each Dawn I Die Ergastolo Ernest Goes to Jail Escape from Alcatraz Escape from Sobibor Escape Plan The Escapist (2008)
 Everynight ... Everynight The Experiment (2010)
 Das Experiment F 
 Face/Off Fast-Walking Felon Female Prisoner 701: Scorpion The First Time Is the Last Time For You I Die Fortress (1992)
 Fortress 2: Re-Entry Fortune and Men's Eyes The Fox of Glenarvon G 
 Gamer Get the Gringo Ghosts... of the Civil Dead The Ghost of Frankenstein Gideon's Trumpet Go for Broke! (1951)
 Goodfellas Gone With the Wind The Green Mile Greenfingers Guardians of the Galaxy Gunga Din H 
 H3 Half Past Dead Half Past Dead 2 Heartlock Hell to Eternity Hellgate (1952)
 The Hill The Hole (1960)
 Holes The Hot Box Houdini House of Dracula House of Frankenstein (1944)
 House of Numbers (1957)
 The Human Centipede 3 (Final Sequence) The Hunchback of Notre Dame (1939)
 Hunger (2008)
 The Hurricane (1937)
 The Hurricane (1999)

 I 
 I Am a Fugitive from a Chain Gang I Believe in You I Love You Phillip Morris I Want to Live! I'm Going to Get You, Elliott Boy If I Want to Whistle, I Whistle Il camorrista In Hell (2003)
 In the Name of the Father In Prison Awaiting Trial An Innocent Man Inside the Walls of Folsom Prison Invisible Stripes Island of Fire J 
 Jailbait (2004)
 Jamila dan Sang Presiden Je li jasno, prijatelju? El juego de Arcibel Juarez (1939)

 K 
 Kill Kill Faster Faster King of the Damned Kiss of the Spider Woman L 
 The Last Castle Last Light The Last Mile (1959)
 Law Abiding Citizen Let's Go to Prison Les Misérables (1935)
 Lilies Lion's Den (2008)
 Lock Up Lockdown Locked Up: A Mother's Rage The Loners The Longest Yard (1974)
 The Longest Yard (2005)
 Love Child (1982)
 Lucky Break (2001)

 M 
 Made in Britain Madea Goes to Jail The Magic of Ordinary Days Les mains libres Maléfique The Maltese Falcon (1931)
 A Man Escaped Manners of Dying Marquis The Mask of Zorro Maundy Thursday Mean Frank and Crazy Tony Mean Machine Memoirs of Prison Men of San Quentin Midnight Express Miracle in Cell No. 7 Moon 44 Mrs. Soffel Murder in the First Mutiny in the Big House My Life for Ireland My Six Convicts N 
 Naked Gun : The Final Insult National Security (2012)
 Natural Born Killers New Alcatraz The New Guy A Nightmare on Elm Street (1984)
 A Nightmare on Elm Street (2010)
 Night Train to Munich 
 No Escape (1994)
 North by Northwest O 
 Odd Man Out Ohm Kruger One Day in the Life of Ivan Denisovich Out of Sight Outland Outside These Walls P 
 Papillon The Paradine Case Pardon Us The Party The Pearl of Death Penitentiary (1938)
 Penitentiary II Perfect Exchange Pirates of the Caribbean: Curse of the Black Pearl Porridge The Pot Carriers Pressure Point Prison (1987)
 Prison Break Prison of Secrets Prison on Fire Prison on Fire II Prison on Fire – Life Sentence Prison Song Prison-A-Go-Go! The Prisoner of Shark Island Procesado 1040 A Prophet Pros & Cons Psycho (1960)
 Public Hero No. 1 The Pursuit of Happiness (1971)

 R 
 Raising Arizona The Reader Reflections on a Crime Release the Prisoners to Spring Riding High (1950)
 Riki-Oh: The Story of Ricky Ring of Death Riot Riot in Cell Block 11 The Rock Roxie Hart (1942)
 Runaway Train S 
 Sadomania Scarlett (1994)
 The Score (1978)
 La Scoumoune Scum The Second Hundred Years Seed (2007)
 A Sense of Freedom Seven Keys Sex, Drugs, Rock & Roll The Shawshank Redemption Sherlock Holmes (1932)
 Short Eyes Shot Caller The Sign of the Cross Slaughterhouse Rock Sleepers Somebody Has to Shoot the Picture (1990)
 The Son of Monte Cristo 
 Spotlight Scandals Starred Up Stir Stir Crazy Stoic Stranger Inside Strawberry Fields (1997)
 The Sun Sets at Dawn T 
 Tango and Cash The Adventures of Tom Sawyer (1938)
 Toy Story 3 The Trial of Joan of Arc This Is My Affair Tower of London (1939)
 Tower of London (1962)
 Train to Alcatraz (1948)
 True Believer (1989)
 Turning to Stone Two Thousand Women Two-Way Stretch U 
 Un chant d'amour Unchained Undisputed Undisputed II: Last Man Standing Undisputed III: Redemption The United States of Leland V 
 Vendetta Violence in a Women's Prison Virginia City (1940)

 W 
 Walls The Weak and the Wicked Wedlock Wee Willie Winkie Weeds White Heat Wild Bill Women in Cell Block 7 Wrong Turn 3: Left for Dead Y 
 You Can't Beat the Law You Can't Take It With You Z 
 The Zero Years (2005)

 Documentaries featuring prisons 
 The Cats of Mirikitani Days of Waiting: The Life & Art of Estelle Ishigo Family GatheringOne Punch Homicide
 The Feminist on Cellblock Y (2018)
 Prison Ball To Be Takei Topaz (1945)
 Unfinished Business'' (1985)

See also 
 Prison film
 Films set on Devil's Island
 :Category:Films set in prison

References

 
Prisons
Films